Karmen Aksoy (born July 8, 2003 in İstanbul, Turkey) is a Turkish female volleyball player. She plays for Vakıfbank Istanbul. She is playing in the 2022 European Cup.

Career

Vakıfbank Istanbul
On 9 November 2021, she played her first match with Vakıfbank in the match of Sarıyer Belediyespor.

Aksoy, who was born in 2003, who grew up with Vakıfbank Istanbul infrastructure and wore the VakıfBank jersey for the first time in this match, finished the match with 8 points, which she started in the first 6 games.

Galatasaray
On August 16, 2022, she signed a one-year loan contract with Galatasaray.

References

External links
Player profile at Volleybox.net

2003 births
Living people
Turkish women's volleyball players
VakıfBank S.K. volleyballers
Galatasaray S.K. (women's volleyball) players